is a Japanese manga series written and illustrated by Takuma Morishige. The series follows a girl named Rumi Yokoi who is constantly distracted by her neighboring classmate, Toshinari Seki, as he indulges in elaborate hobbies and somehow never gets caught in the process. Originally published as a one-shot in 2010, it started serialization in the November 2010 issue of Media Factory's Comic Flapper magazine. Vertical publishes the manga in North America. An original video animation by Shin-Ei Animation was released bundled with the limited edition of the manga's fifth volume on January 4, 2014, and a 21-episode television series adaptation aired in Japan between January and May 2014. A new manga series debuted on July 4, 2020.

Characters

, Fumika Shimizu (live-action)
Rumi is the viewpoint character and narrator of Seki's games. She continuously attempts to pay attention in class but is almost always distracted by her neighbor's antics. She sometimes tries to make Seki concentrate on class by sabotaging his projects, but usually finds herself joining in on them, though Seki misunderstands these attempts. In fact, some episodes feature Rumi getting just as, if not more so, involved than Seki in his games, such as when he spends a day knitting or whenever he brings the Robot Family into school. 

, Yutaro Watanabe (live-action)
Normally referred to by his surname, Seki is Rumi's classmate, and is a cheerful but mysterious character who is always playing games at his desk, which at times, include some elaborate setups. His activity bothers Rumi to no end, although he is almost never caught in the act by the teachers. In his desk is a complex array of objects that, if disturbed by anyone but himself, are impossible to put back together. He rarely speaks, but is sometimes seen chatting with his friends. Despite his normal demeanor around his fellow students outside of the classroom, he is occasionally shown to have a dark and sadistic side. This comes through his destruction, sometimes wantonly, of his games and toys. He is also slightly superstitious, as is shown when some of his projects become so intense for Rumi that she secretly gets involved, scaring Seki out of his wits and his flippant behavior towards education.

Supporting characters
  sits near Rumi and Seki during art class and becomes Rumi's friend. She assumes Seki and Rumi are lovers because of the way they interact in class. Regardless of any relationship Rumi and Seki may actually have or not have in the present or future, almost everything she assumes is entirely based on her own imagination. . Portrayed by Rika Mayama in the live-action drama.
  is Rumi's classmate with glasses. 
  is a laid-back classmate who is easily bored and often gets in the way of Seki's activities. 
  is a classmate who sits directly in front of Seki. Due to his height and large build, he blocks the teachers from noticing Seki's activities. 
  is Rumi's classmate and friend.

Media

Manga
Written and illustrated by Takuma Morishige, the manga began as a one-shot published in the August 2010 issue of Media Factory's Comic Flapper magazine, and later started serialization in the magazine's November 2010 issue. The first tankōbon volume was published on April 23, 2011 and the tenth was released in March 2017. Vertical licensed the manga for North American publication under the title My Neighbor Seki, and has been releasing volumes since January 2015. A new series titled My Neighbor Seki-kun Junior launched in the July 4, 2020 issue of Monthly Comic Flapper.

Anime

A 21-episode anime television series, directed by Yūji Mutoh and produced by Shin-Ei Animation, aired in Japan between January 5 and May 25, 2014 and was simulcast by Crunchyroll under the title Tonari no Seki-kun: The Master of Killing Time. The fifth manga volume was released simultaneously on January 4, 2014 with a limited edition, bundled with an original animation DVD containing two additional episodes. The series was released on DVD in two parts on May 28, 2014, with a bonus episode on each disc. The music in the series is composed by Akifumi Tada. The drama CD for the anime was released on January 22, 2014, by King Records.

Live-action
The series was adapted into a live-action show where it was paired with another live-action adaptation titled Rumi's Phenomenon. Both programs involve a main character named Rumi. Morishige said "I feel a sense of odd destiny that the heroines' names are coincidentally the same."

Reception
Over 3 million copies of the manga have been sold as of July 2014. The manga was one of the works nominated in the fifth Manga Taishō awards in 2012. My Neighbor Seki was listed on YALSA's 2016 list of Great Graphic Novels for Teens.

Rebecca Silverman of Anime News Network gave the first volume of the manga an overall grade of C+. Karen Mead of Japanator liked that the anime put the detail into Seki's projects rather than the characters, and that while the show could have worked as a three- to four-minute short, that it gets stretched to eight minutes with opening and ending themes gives it a chance to build atmosphere and tension. Richard Eisenbeis of Kotaku called it "the most basic, yet perhaps most entertaining, anime of the season."

References

External links
  
  
 

2010 manga
Anime series based on manga
Comedy anime and manga
Kadokawa Dwango franchises
Media Factory manga
School life in anime and manga
Seinen manga
Sentai Filmworks
Shin-Ei Animation
Slice of life anime and manga
Vertical (publisher) titles